Abdolsamad Marfavi (born May 18, 1964 in Khorramshahr, Iran) is an Iranian football coach and former player.

Club career
He played the majority of his playing career for IPL giants Esteghlal.

International career
Marfavi debuted for the Iranian national team against Kuwait on February 27, 1987. He scored 11 goals in 31 appearances for Iran.

Managerial career
He was Esteghlal's assistant coach from 2003 until 2006 when he was replaced with Amir Ghalenoei who was appointed as the Iran national football team coach in August 2006 just one month before the season starts. He had a good season result till 27th week of the season and Esteghlal was in first place but the last three weeks of the season was a distastor for him where he only earned one point out of 3 home matches and finished fourth. He came back as the assistant coach of Nasser Hejazi next season but after the differences he left the club and returned the season after to help Amir Ghalenoei to win the league. After Amir Ghalenoei left the club for Sepahan, he was re-appointed as the head coach of Esteghlal in July 2009. On 18 May 2010, he extended his contract with Esteghlal for another season. However, he would later resign from his position only a couple of days later. On 2 June 2010, he was appointed head coach of Mes Kerman and was resigned on 25 August 2011. He became head coach of Saba Qom on 25 September 2012 and signed a contract until end of the season. Before the start of 2013–14 season, it was announced that his contract will not renewed. On 11 November 2013, he was reappointed as Saba's head coach for a second time.

Honours
Gold Medal winner at 1990 Asian Games, as member of the Iran national football team.
Nominated for 1991 Asian Footballer of the year winning 16 votes losing to Yong-Hwan Chung who received 28 and Joo-Sung Kim who won the award with 31 votes.

References

External links

 Samad Marfavi at TeamMelli.com
 Marfavi takes over Esteghlal reins

1965 births
Living people
Iranian footballers
Iranian football managers
Esteghlal F.C. players
Esteghlal F.C. managers
Niroye Zamini players
Iran international footballers
Expatriate footballers in Kuwait
Iranian Arab sportspeople
Iranian expatriate footballers
Iranian expatriate sportspeople in Singapore
Asian Games gold medalists for Iran
1988 AFC Asian Cup players
1992 AFC Asian Cup players
Asian Games medalists in football
Footballers at the 1990 Asian Games
Saba Qom F.C. managers
Paykan F.C. managers
Sanat Mes Kerman F.C. managers
Association football forwards
Medalists at the 1990 Asian Games
Kuwait SC players
Iranian expatriate sportspeople in Kuwait
Tanjong Pagar United FC players
Expatriate footballers in Singapore
Bahman players
Keshavarz players
People from Khorramabad
Persian Gulf Pro League managers